De Sitter is a lunar impact crater that is located near the northern limb of the Moon, to the north of the Baillaud–Euctemon crater pair. Due to its location, this crater appears very foreshortened when viewed from the Earth, limiting the detail that can be viewed. The crater also receives sunlight at a low angle, when it is on the sunlit side.

This crater forms part of an unusual three-crater cluster, with De Sitter overlying the northeast rim of De Sitter L and the southern rim of De Sitter M. All three craters are of comparable dimension, with the largest being De Sitter M. Where De Sitter overlies the other two craters, its outer rim appears slumped. The rim is more sharply formed along the east-southeast side. Lying next to this part of the rim is De Sitter G, a small formation of two merged craters.

The interior floor of De Sitter is somewhat irregular and hummocky, with a slender central ridge near the midpoint. There are several small and tiny craterlets across the interior floor. There are some rilles near the inner wall, possibly volcanic in origin.

Satellite craters
By convention these features are identified on lunar maps by placing the letter on the side of the crater midpoint that is closest to De Sitter.

References
 

 
 
 
 
 
 
 
 
 
 
 
 

Impact craters on the Moon